The 1997 Scottish Claymores season was the third season for the franchise in the World League of American Football (WLAF). The team was led by head coach Jim Criner in his third year, and played its home games at Murrayfield Stadium in Edinburgh, Scotland. They finished the regular season in third place with a record of five wins and five losses.

General manager Mike Keller resigned at the end of the season, wanting to pursue opportunities in the United States.

Offseason

World League draft

Personnel

Staff

Roster

Schedule

Standings

Game summaries

Week 1: at Amsterdam Admirals

Week 3: vs Rhein Fire

Week 4: at Frankfurt Galaxy

Week 6: vs Amsterdam Admirals

Week 7: at Rhein Fire

Week 8: vs Frankfurt Galaxy

Awards
After the completion of the regular season, the All-World League team was selected by members of the media. Overall, Scotland had five players selected. The selections were:

 George Coghill, safety
 Scott Couper, offensive national player
 Wayne Lammle, punter
 Jason Simmons, defensive end
 Siran Stacy, running back

Additionally, Simmons was selected defensive MVP by the six World League head coaches.

Notes

References

Scottish Claymores seasons